The Investigators was a BAFTA-nominated  children's science program, presented by children, on Channel 4 in Great Britain. It showed various interesting experiments from how to blow a balloon up with yeast to building bridges. Other experiments included on the program were making salmon flavoured ice cream and making periscopes.
It aired on Saturday morning.

References

External links
 

British television shows for schools
Science education television series
Channel 4 original programming
Science and technology in the United Kingdom